The Cathedral Parish of Saint Gregory the Great, also known as Legazpi Cathedral and locally as Albay Cathedral, is a Roman Catholic cathedral dedicated to Saint Gregory the Great in the Old Albay District of the city of Legazpi, Albay, in the Bicol region of the Philippines. It is the seat of the Diocese of Legazpi. In 2018, a historical marker  of the National Historical Commission of the Philippines was unveiled at the cathedral.

History
 The city of Legazpi today was initially a barangay called Sawangan, which at present corresponds to the location of the Legazpi Port. The mission in the area, the Mission de San Gregorio Magno de Sawangan, was founded by the Franciscans in 1587 as a visita of Cagsaua. Its first church of nipa and lumber was constructed which was placed under the patronage of Saint Gregory the Great, the pope of the Catholic Church from 590 to 604 CE. In 1616, it became a full pledged parish and was called Albay. It was reconstructed with wood planks in 1635 which was razed by fire in 1754. The first stone church was built under Fr. Pedro Romero in 1834 which was charred again during the Philippine-American War in 1900. In 1945, parts of the church were damaged during the World War II, and was subsequently repaired under Fr. Nicanor Belleza. In 1951, it became the seat and cathedral of the Legazpi Diocese upon its foundation from the territories of Diocese of Nueva Caceres.

Gallery

References

External links
 Facebook page  

Roman Catholic churches in Albay
Baroque architecture in the Philippines
Marked Historical Structures of the Philippines
Spanish Colonial architecture in the Philippines
Roman Catholic cathedrals in the Philippines
17th-century Roman Catholic church buildings in the Philippines
18th-century Roman Catholic church buildings in the Philippines
19th-century Roman Catholic church buildings in the Philippines
Buildings and structures in Legazpi, Albay
Churches in the Roman Catholic Diocese of Legazpi